The Battle of Cocherel was a battle fought on 16 May 1364 between the forces of  Charles V of France and the forces of Charles II of Navarre (known as Charles the Bad), over the succession to the dukedom of Burgundy. The result was a French victory.

Background
The French crown had been at odds with Navarre (near southern Gascony) since 1354. In 1363 the Navarrese used the captivity of John II of France in London and the political weakness of the Dauphin to try to seize power. Although there was no formal treaty, Edward III of England supported the Navarrese moves, particularly as there was a prospect that he might gain control over the northern and western provinces as a consequence. There had been a peace treaty known as the Treaty of Brétigny  in place between England and France since 1360. As England was supposed to be at peace with France the English  military forces used to support Navarre were drawn from the mercenary routier companies, not the king of England's army, thus avoiding a breach of the peace treaty.

Armies
The king of France's forces were led by Bertrand du Guesclin, though Jean, Count of Auxerre was the highest-ranking noble present. There were knights from Burgundy (f. e. Jean de Vienne), Breton, Picard, Parisian and Gascon people.

The forces of Navarre were commanded by the Gascon chief, Jean de Grailly, Captal de Buch and mainly consisted of 800 to 900 knights and 4000 to 5000 soldiers from Normandy, Gascony and England, including 300 English archers. The most expert, with the largest company of men at arms and archers in his train, was an English knight, called Sir John Jouel.  Sir John Jouel commanded the first battalion of English, which consisted of men at arms and archers. The Captal de Buch had the second battalion, which, one with another, was about four hundred combatants The English and Gascons consisted mainly of routier companies that had been operating in Brittany and Western France.

Battle 
The Navarrese army was lined up in three battalions. It took up a defensive position, with the archers forming wedged divisions along the front, as had been a standard tactic for English armies of the period. In the past when the opposing army had advanced then they would be cut to pieces by the archers,  however in this battle, du Guesclin managed to break the defensive formation by attacking and then pretending to retreat, which tempted Sir John Jouel and his battalion from their hill in pursuit. Captal de Buch and his company followed. A flank attack by du Guesclin's reserve then won the day.

Notes

References
 Turnbull, Stephen.  The Book of the Medieval Knight.  London: Arms and Armour Press, 1985.  
 
 
 

Battles involving France
Eure
1364 in Europe
1360s in France
Conflicts in 1364
Military history of Normandy
Battles of the Middle Ages
Hundred Years' War, 1369–1389